Sanad Sharahili (born 31 March 1986) is a Saudi Arabian football player who plays for Mudhar as a defender.

Honours

External links
 

Living people
1986 births
Association football defenders
Saudi Arabian footballers
Sportspeople from Riyadh
Ettifaq FC players
Al-Raed FC players
Al-Taawoun FC players
Al-Shabab FC (Riyadh) players
Al-Kawkab FC players
Al-Anwar Club players
Al-Taqadom FC players
Mudhar Club players
Saudi First Division League players
Saudi Second Division players
Saudi Professional League players
Saudi Third Division players